Amatitlán Municipality is a municipality in Veracruz, Mexico. It is located about 231 km from state capital Xalapa to the south-east. It has a surface of 169.4 km2.

Borders
Amatitlán Municipality is delimited to the north-east by Tlacotalpan Municipality, to the south-east by José Azueta, to the south-west by Cosamaloapan, to the west by Ixmatlahuacan, and to the north-west by Acula.

Products
It produces maize and beans.

References

External links 
  Municipal Official Site
  Municipal Official Information

Municipalities of Veracruz